Polyphlebium tenuissimum, synonym Trichomanes tenuissimum, is a species of fern in the family Hymenophyllaceae. It is endemic to Ecuador. In 2006, in a taxonomic revision of the family Hymenophyllaceae, Ebihara et al. assigned this species to the genus Polyphlebium rather than Trichomanes. However the combination does not appear to have been formally published; hence the "comb. ined." (combinatio inedita) in the Checklist of Ferns and Lycophytes of the World.

References

Hymenophyllales
Ferns of Ecuador
Endemic flora of Ecuador
Taxonomy articles created by Polbot
Taxobox binomials not recognized by IUCN